Rainforest Partnership is an environmental organization based in Austin, Texas that works to help rainforest communities in Ecuador and Peru become economically self-sufficient, while educating communities in the United States about the role rainforests play in climate protection. It serves to link communities located in and around Latin American rainforests with partner communities in the United States.

History

Rainforest Partnership was founded in 2007 by Niyanta Spelman, Hazel Barbour, Jordan Erdos, and Bob Warneke, facilitated by Beth Caplan.

In 2008, Rainforest Partnership had established its first major partnership with the community of Chipaota in Peru.

Projects and Activities

Projects

Projects aim to create and support sustainable economic alternatives to deforestation and give local communities a stake in preserving their forests. The mission of a project depends on the nature of the forest and the local community, this includes creating a market in the United States for shade grown crops such as acai berries, cacao, or coffee, medicinal plants, palm trees or for crafts made by local artisans.  Rainforest Partnership's first project, in Chipaota, Peru, involved creating a sustainable management plan for harvesting piassaba palms from which to make brooms.

In some communities, such as Pampa Hermosa, Peru, it is more appropriate to develop plans for sustainable logging and for ecotourism. In protecting cloud forests, as the project in Pampa Hermosa aims to do by introducing alternatives to deforestation, local communities are faced with a "win-win" situation according to Ken Young of UT Austin's Geography department.  Animals and wildlife are protected while the needs of local people go unharmed. Through a bottom up approach, Rainforest Partnership matches economic development choices to the needs and desires, culture, knowledge, and skills of local communities, and to the opportunities presented by each individual rainforest.  The organization functions on a "collective model" in which "much depends on the active consent and ideas of the Latin American partners" describes Michael Barnes of the Austin American-Statesman.

Films for the Forest

Since May 13, 2010, Rainforest Partnership has held the short film competition Films for the Forest (F3) in which films between 30 seconds to 3 minutes long are submitted centered around a featured theme. Since 2012, F3 has been featured at SXSW Film Festival Community Screenings. The films held in the competition are sent from around the world, including "countries as far away as Brazil, Italy and India". Richard Linklater has served as the primary judge for the competition every year since 2010 alongside guest judges including: Lisa McWilliams, Michel Scott, and Evan Smith (2010) Elizabeth Avellan and Ed Begley Jr. (2011) Elizabeth Avellan and Philippe Cousteau Jr. (2012) Philippe Cousteau Jr., Jay Duplass, and Dana Wheeler-Nicholson (2013) Sarah Backhouse, Dilly Gent, and Ginger Sledge (2014) Eloise DeJoria, Taylor Ellison, and Kenny Laubbacher (2015) Solly Granastein and Julio Quintana (2016) Michael Cain and Alonso Mayo (2017).

World Rainforest Day

On June 22, 2017, Rainforest Partnership launched the inaugural World Rainforest Day. The holiday was started as a means to bring awareness to the importance of tropical rainforests and encourage action to prevent deforestation. Partners for World Rainforest Day include Avoided Deforestation Partners, South by Southwest, Austin EcoNetwork, Earthx Film, Bonobo Conservation Initiative, 2020 or Bust, Earth Day ATX, and Ear to the Earth.

Media

Rainforest Partnership has been featured in multiple local media outlets including the Austin American-Statesman's online counterpart, Austin360.com, listener-supported public radio station KUT, and local news station News 8 YNN Austin. Further articles have appeared in The Austin Chronicle, an alternative weekly newspaper published on Thursdays in Austin.

References

External links
 http://www.rainforestpartnership.org
 http://www.filmsfortheforest.org
 http://www.worldrainforestday.com

Nature conservation organizations based in the United States
Organizations based in Austin, Texas
Environmental organizations based in Texas